AMPCO METAL is a diversified speciality alloy engineering company working primarily in copper based alloys, non-sparking safety tools and speciality welding products. The Switzerland based company is a manufacturer of engineered alloys of different compositions and properties, intended for specific uses in the aerospace, automotive, energy conservation, manufacturing and other industries. It also produces non-sparking safety tools for the oil industry, as well as the firefighting and fire prevention sectors. Additionally, AMPCO METAL provides engineering, machining and welding advice to the industry, in matters involving its speciality copper, aluminium-bronze and other alloys. AMPCO METAL currently employs approximately 250 people worldwide, and operates a number of divisions and sales offices on three continents.

Divisions

AMPCO METAL is a speciality copper alloy producer. The company's alloy engineering department develops a variety of alloys with exact properties to satisfy the requirements of specific fields, including the aerospace, automotive, machining, welding and plastics injection-moulding industries.
AMPCO METAL S.A. (Switzerland) Corporate Headquarters
AMPCO Metal Inc. (USA) Production foundry, distribution center and sales office
METAL INDUSTRIEL AMPCO Investissements SAS (France) Production foundry, distribution center and sales office
AMPCO Metal S.A (Belgium) Machine shop and sales office for Benelux
AMPCO METAL SAS (France) sales office
AMPCO Metal Deutschland GmbH (Germany) Machine shop and sales office
AMPCO Metal Kft (Hungary) Sales office for Eastern Europe and Russia
AMPCO Metal Srl (Italy) Sales office
AMPCO EDSC (European Distribution Service Center)  (Netherlands) Distribution center for EU
AMPCO Metal Sp. z o.o. (Poland) Sales office
AMPCO Metal Portugal, Lda. (Portugal) Sales office
AMPCO Metal España (Spain) Sales office
Ampco Metal Ltd (United Kingdom) Sales office
Ampco Metal (Foshan) Co. Ltd. (China) Distribution center and sales offices
Ampco Metal (Xian) Co. Ltd. (China) Distribution center and sales offices
Ampco Metal (Changzou) Co. Ltd. (China) Distribution center and sales offices
Ampco Metal (Tianjin) Co. Ltd. (China) Distribution center and sales offices
AC Safety tools SA (Switzerland) Distribution and Sales office for non-sparking safety tools
Carltsoe Safety Tools ApS (Denmark) Sales office for non-sparking safety tools
AC SAFETY TOOLS (Tianjin) CO., LTD (China) Production and distribution of Safety tools

History
The American Metal Products Company was founded on June 6, 1914, in Milwaukee, WI by inventor August Littman, with a small group of other entrepreneurs. The company's first product was a specially-formulated bronze alloy hard enough to cut steel, aptly named Bronze — a name derived from the new company's own identity.
An early version of the company's present diamond-shaped logo saw the day. It has remained in use in substantially the same recognizable format ever since. The American Metal Products Company slowly expanded its activities into the production of aluminium bronze alloys as sand castings, forgings and centrifugal castings.

The company was renamed "AMPCO METAL" in 1930, by which time it had built itself a reputation as a reliable producer of high quality alloys.
The Second World War strongly increased the demand for copper-based alloys and industrial bronzes, especially in the field of aeronautics. By 1944, manufacturing operations had grown from 100 to 2,500 employees, and every American airplane carried AMPCO METAL parts somewhere in its structure—in its engines, landing gear, propellers or airframe.
In the marine environment, AMPCO METAL propellers were manufactured for landing barges and ships, and generally, AMPCO METAL alloys could be found in most sectors of military operations.
Innovation was an important part of company philosophy from the outset. From 1922 onward into the 1970s, intensive research was done on the development of special non-sparking, non-magnetic hand tools for highly specialised fields such as the petroleum and natural gas industries, fire fighting and prevention, and the non-ferrous-metal welding sector. Centrifugally-cast bronzes, special hard bronzes for tooling and die applications, nickel-aluminium bronzes, high-strength aeronautical alloys as well as high-conductivity welding electrodes were all flagship products in these diverse industries.

From the late 1950s, AMPCO METAL developed an extensive sales and distribution network in different countries, primarily across Europe, in order to increase contact with its various markets.

In the 1970s, AMPCO METAL became the first alloy producer certified by the ASME (American Society of Mechanical Engineers) and in the 1980s, the first company to use EPC (Evaporative Pattern Casting) manufacturing processes in copper-based alloy production.
In 2003, AMPCO METAL launched a sales and marketing department in Tianjin, China.
AMPCO METAL is now active on three continents and in twelve countries.

References

External links
AMPCO METAL web site

Manufacturing companies established in 1914
1914 establishments in Wisconsin
Manufacturing companies of Switzerland